Rugby union is a minor but growing sport in Cameroon. They were ranked 104th by the IRB as of August 2022.

Governing body 
The governing body for the game is the Cameroonian Rugby Federation (Fédération Camerounaise de Rugby).

History
Cameroon is a former French colony, and the sport was introduced from France. Originally the game was mainly played by white expatriates. However, most of the participants these days are Africans.

Cameroon has a long-established union and players come from all walks of life. However, due to bad economic conditions, and the migration of many players to France, such as Serge Betsen, it has been difficult to maintain a decent domestic game.

Carol Manga (born ), who grew up in Yaounde, loved association football as a child, and started playing rugby union at the age of 14, going on to play in the national team at the age of 16. He has captained both rugby sevens and rugby union teams. After moving to Australia in 2008 to play rugby, he discovered and fell in love with rugby league, and took the game back to Cameroon in 2012, helping to establish the Cameroon Rugby League XIII.

In 2002, the Confederation of African Rugby held their conference in Cameroon.

See also 
 Cameroon national rugby union team 
 Confederation of African Rugby
 Africa Cup

External links
 IRB Cameroon page 
 CAR
 Cameroon rugby news
 Castres lends Africa helping hand (IRB.COM) Friday 30 January 2009
 "Islam and Rugby" on the Rugby Readers review
 Archives du Rugby: Cameroun

References